North Hornell is a village in Steuben County, New York, United States. The population was 778 at the 2010 census.

The Village of North Hornell is in the Town of Hornellsville, north of the City of Hornell.

History

In 2004, the North Hornell village council started studies on a possible merger with the City of Hornell, dissolving the village, or remaining an independent entity (village) to reduce annual costs.  The study is still  ongoing.

The citizens of the village voted not to merge with the City of Hornell.

Geography

Conjoined New York State Route 21 and New York State Route 36 form a major highway through the village.

North Hornell is on the north bank of the Canisteo River.

There is a creek running through the village named Elmhurst Creek.

Streets and layout

Primary streets 

Cleveland Avenue, north–south
Seneca Road, north–south

Secondary streets 

Bowen Street, east–west
Country Club Road, east up Hillside
Rural Avenue, east–west
McKinley Avenue, north–south
Avondale Avenue, loops west
Woodbury Place, east–west
Wells Street, east–west
Jones Street, east–west
Gifford Street, north–south
Linwood Avenue, east–west
Bethesda Drive, east–west
Elmwood Avenue, east–west
Maplewood Avenue, east–west
First Street, north–south
Second Street, north–south
Wightman Avenue, east–west
Third Street, north–south
Fourth Street, north–south
West Maplewood Avenue, east–west
Park Street, east–west
Mary Street, east–west
Pittsburgh Street, east–west
Cameron Boulevard, loops east
Marick Park Drive, north–south
Richland Street, east–west
Chambers Street, north–south

Alleys and fire lanes 

Totten Lane, east–west
First Alley, north–south
Second Alley, north–south
Third Alley, north–south
Fourth Alley, north–south
South Circle, north–south

Demographics

As of the census of 2000, there were 851 people, 303 households, and 210 families residing in the village. The population density was 1,533.4 people per square mile (597.4/km2). There were 324 housing units at an average density of 583.8 per square mile (227.4/km2). The racial makeup of the village was 97.06% White, 0.47% African American, 1.88% Asian, 0.12% from other races, and 0.47% from two or more races. Hispanic or Latino of any race were 1.06% of the population.

There were 303 households, out of which 30.4% had children under the age of 18 living with them, 55.4% were married couples living together, 7.6% had a female householder with no husband present, and 30.4% were non-families. 26.1% of all households were made up of individuals, and 16.8% had someone living alone who was 65 years of age or older. The average household size was 2.39 and the average family size was 2.88.

In the village, the population was spread out, with 19.6% under the age of 18, 4.7% from 18 to 24, 20.4% from 25 to 44, 24.2% from 45 to 64, and 31.0% who were 65 years of age or older. The median age was 48 years. For every 100 females, there were 81.1 males. For every 100 females age 18 and over, there were 76.7 males.

The median income for a household in the village was $48,571, and the median income for a family was $61,125. Males had a median income of $42,000 versus $23,125 for females. The per capita income for the village was $24,825. About 3.4% of families and 6.5% of the population were below the poverty line, including 5.5% of those under age 18 and 1.9% of those age 65 or over.

See also
 Bethesda Hospital

References

Links
Village Website

Villages in New York (state)
Villages in Steuben County, New York
Hornell, New York